The Polish Socialist Party of the Prussian Partition, sometimes Polish Socialist Party in Prussia ( - ) - was a Polish political party.

The party was founded in 1893 in Berlin by émigré members of the Polish Socialist Party. Until 1913, the party had formal links with the Social Democratic Party of Germany. Following the restoration of Polish statehood in 1919, the party merged with Polish Socialist Party.

Notable members
Marcin Kasprzak

1893 establishments in Germany
1919 disestablishments in Poland
Defunct socialist parties in Germany
Defunct socialist parties in Poland
Polish Socialist Party
Polish independence organisations
Political parties disestablished in 1919
Political parties established in 1893